Sarlak is a clan from the Bakhtiyari tribe and a village in Lorestan Province, Iran.

Sarlak may also refer to:

Other places 
 Sarlak, Republic of Bashkortostan, Russia
 Sarlak, a district in Tabriz, Iran

People 
 Alireza Sarlak, Iranian freestyle wrestler
 Hamed Sarlak, Iranian footballer
 Milad Sarlak, Iranian footballer
 Mohammad Ali Sarlak, Iranian professor
 Siamak Sarlak, Iranian footballer
 Vahid Sarlak, Iranian judoka

See also 
 Sarlacc, a creature from the Star Wars franchise.